The Pentax K-S1 is a midrange DSLR camera announced by Ricoh on August 27, 2014. It has a 20 megapixel sensor — new to the Pentax line-up — and an anti-aliasing filter simulator as previously seen in the Pentax K-3. Also adopted from the K-3 is compatibility with the Pentax FluCard, which allows wireless tethered shooting and wireless download of images from the camera.

In other respects, the K-S1 inherits a fair amount from the K-30/K-50 lineage, such as the compact, 100% coverage viewfinder, 1/6000s shutter and D-LI109 battery. A stereo microphone is also built in, to complement the 1080p at 30 frames/second video capability.

The K-S1 is slightly larger than the Canon EOS 100D, which as of August 2014 was the smallest DSLR in production.

Reception

The K-S1 received mixed to positive reviews and reviews did appreciate that Ricoh attempted to innovate, including having LEDs in the grip, which mostly serves no purpose but can be useful in timer mode. The design was enough of a departure from normal Pentax cameras that multiple reviews noted that the K-S2 returned to "normality in terms of design and button layout".

The K-S1 won the 2015 Australian Camera magazine Imaging Awards for customer digital SLR of the year.

References

External links 
 Specifications for K-S1 at dpreview.com

K-S1
Live-preview digital cameras
Cameras introduced in 2014
Pentax K-mount cameras